Skydive! Go Ahead and Jump (often stylized as SKYDIVE!) is a video game developed by The Groove Alliance and Gonzo Games and published by Electronic Arts for Windows and Macintosh in 1999.

Reception

The game received unfavorable reviews to overwhelming dislike according to the review aggregation website GameRankings.

It won GameSpots award for "Worst Game of the Year".

References

External links
 

1999 video games
Classic Mac OS games
Electronic Arts games
Parachuting video games
Windows games
Video games developed in the United States